Eskdale (sometimes written as EskDale) is an unincorporated community in western Millard County, Utah, United States, just east of the Nevada border.

Description
The community is a farming commune and is located in the southern part of Snake Valley, near the western flank of the Conger Range (part of the larger Confusion Range). It was founded in 1955 by Dr. M. L. Glendenning as a religious community of the House of Aaron. The name itself comes from the River Esk in Scotland.

The town is home to EskDale High School, which serves the communities of EskDale, Garrison, Burbank, and Baker (Nevada), along with other locals in the Snake Valley area. EskDale is also known for its dairy.

Climate
EskDale has a cold desert climate (Köppen: BWk).

See also

References

External links

 EskDale Dairy
 EskDale Community website

Unincorporated communities in Millard County, Utah
Unincorporated communities in Utah
Great Basin National Heritage Area